Sherifa Gunu is a Ghanaian soul musician. She was born a princess into a royal family of the Kingdom of Dagbon, in the Northern Region of Ghana. Gunu had interest in music and dance during his childhood days.

Sherifa has been in various dancing competition at the regional and national level.

Early life
Sherifa Gunu hwas born in the Kingdom of Dagbon in the Northern Region of Ghana into a royal family. She left school at an early stage and later competed in both regional and national dance competitions.

Musical career
Sherifa Gunu became the northern Regional dance champion and the first runner up in the 1998 Embassy Pleasure, a popular national dance championship in the 1990s. She later participated in the 2003 Hiplife dance championship with the likes of King Ayisoba and Terry Bonchaka.  Gunu became the first runner up to Terry Bonchaka in the finals of the championship. In 2017, she released a single titled Salamatu, which is also the title of one of her albums. She revealed that the reason for the title of the single is to recognize the uniqueness of some African names.

Performances
Sherifa Gunu performed at the National Theatre for the maiden edition of Zongofest, a show to honour distinguished Zongo personalities and also discover young talents. She also performed at a live band music show at the Golden Tulip hotel in Accra during the launch of Ghana's premium networking event known as the ‘Corporate Wednesday’, a show that seeks to bring all business stakeholders together for networking among themselves.

Furthermore, she has done backings for Kojo Antwi, Amakye Dede, Daddy Lumba, Nana Acheampong and Sarkodie and in all she has made three albums.

Awards and nominations
1st runner up, 1998 National Dance Championship (The Embassy Pleasure).

1st runner up, 2003 Hiplife Dance Championship.

Discography

Personal life
Sherifa is a Muslim and a mother of two.

References 

Living people
Ghanaian Muslims
Ghanaian musicians
Dagomba people
Dagbani-language singers
Year of birth missing (living people)
People from Northern Region (Ghana)